Olha Ovdiychuk (born 16 December 1993) is a Ukrainian footballer, who plays as a forward for Fomget GSK in the Turkish Women's Super League and the Ukraine women's national team.

Club career 
Olga played her first match in the Ukrainian championship on May 1, 2009, against club Yatran. 
During the season 2011, she scored 12 goals in 12 national league matches, and her team, underdogs in previous seasons, finished at the 4th position.
In 2012 she joined the Kharkiv team Zhytlobud-1 Kharkiv. With this club, she became champion of Ukraine several times.
In summer 2019 she joined the team of Atlético Madrid, the Spanish champion.
After 3 coaching changes in few months (Sánchez Vera, Pablo López, Dani González) and the strict lockdown measures due to the COVID-19 epidemic in Madrid, in summer 2020 Olga decided to terminate her contract with Atlético Madrid and come back in her country.

After the 2022 Russian invasion of Ukraine, in March 2022 she moved to Turkey and joined Ankara-based club Fomget FSK to play in the second half of the 2021–22 Women's Super League.

International goals

Honours 
Zhytlobud-1
Winners:
 Ukrainian Women's League (7): 2012, 2013, 2014, 2015, 2018, 2019, 2021
 Ukrainian Women's Cup (6): 2013, 2014, 2015, 2016, 2018, 2019
  Turkish Women's Cup : 2022

References

External links 
 
 Profile at wfpl.com.ua

1993 births
Living people
Sportspeople from Rivne Oblast
Ukrainian women's footballers
Ukraine women's international footballers
Ukrainian expatriate women's footballers
Expatriate women's footballers in Spain
Ukrainian expatriate sportspeople in Spain
Women's association football forwards
WFC Lehenda-ShVSM Chernihiv players
WFC Rodyna Kostopil players
Women's association football midfielders
WFC Zhytlobud-1 Kharkiv players
Atlético Madrid Femenino players
Primera División (women) players
Ukrainian expatriate sportspeople in Turkey
Expatriate women's footballers in Turkey
Turkish Women's Football Super League players
Fomget Gençlik ve Spor players